BO2 may refer to:

Arts, entertainment, and media
 Blackout! 2, rap album by Method Man & Redman
 BO2, first song of the Blackout! 2 album
 BO*2, MusiquePlus TV series by the Sckoropad Twins
 Call of Duty: Black Ops II

Other uses
 Bo.2, see List_of_aircraft_(B)#Borel
Borate

See also
 B2O
 Bobo (disambiguation)
 Boo (disambiguation)